Kasabian is an English rock band.

Kasabian or Kassabian may also refer to:

 Kasabian (album), by Kasabian, 2004
 Linda Kasabian (born 1949), "Manson family" member and key witness in the 1970 Tate-LaBianca murder trial
 Mihran Kassabian (1870–1910), Armenian-American radiologist
 Rita Kassabian, Lebanese-Armenian composer

See also
Kasab (disambiguation)
Kassab (disambiguation)

Armenian-language surnames